Synodontis gobroni is a species of upside-down catfish native to the Niger River basin where it is found in the nations of Guinea, Mali, Niger and Nigeria.  This species grows to a length of  TL.

References

External links 

gobroni
Catfish of Africa
Freshwater fish of West Africa
Fish described in 1954
Taxa named by Jacques Daget